Loel Dean Frederickson (September 3, 1919 – September 18, 2009) was an American football, basketball, and baseball coach. He served as the head football coach at Carthage College in Carthage, Illinois for two seasons, from 1950 to 1951, compiling a record of 2–16.

Frederickson died on September 18, 2009.

Head coaching record

Football

References

External links
 

1919 births
2009 deaths
American football centers
Basketball coaches from Minnesota
Carthage Firebirds baseball coaches
Carthage Firebirds men's basketball coaches
Carthage Firebirds football coaches
Minnesota Golden Gophers football players
Minnesota State–Moorhead Dragons football coaches
Sportspeople from Saint Paul, Minnesota
Coaches of American football from Minnesota
Players of American football from Saint Paul, Minnesota